Stura was a département of the French Consulate and of the First French Empire in present-day Italy

Stura may also refer to:

Rivers
Stura di Ovada, a river of Liguria and Piedmont, in Italy
Stura del Monferrato, a river of Piedmont, in Italy
Stura di Lanzo, a river of Piedmont, in Italy
Stura di Demonte, a river of Piedmont, in Italy

Valleys 
 Stura Vallis, an ancient river valley of Mars
Stura di Demonte Valley, a valley of Piedmont, in Italy